The 2015 Cleveland Indians season was the 115th season for the franchise. The team played its 22nd season at Progressive Field. The team looked to improve upon their 85–77 record and third-place divisional finish from the previous season; however, the Indians finished in third place in the AL Central with an 81–80 record and missed the playoffs for the second consecutive season and the seventh time in the last eight seasons.

Offseason

October 30: Jason Giambi becomes a free agent. He later retires.
November 3: The Chicago White Sox claimed J. B. Shuck off waivers, and the Indians sent Chris Gimenez to the minors and invited Tyler Cloyd to spring training.
November 6-November 18: Signed 5 players to a minor league contract and invited 3, including Shaun Marcum to spring training.
November 20: Promoted 5 players from the minors.
November 23: Received Charles Brewer from the Arizona Diamondbacks for cash and sent Scott Barnes to the minors.
 Barnes would be later traded to the Baltimore Orioles for cash on November 26.
December 2: Signed Destin Hood to a minor league contract and invited him to spring training.
December 7: Signed Adam Moore to a minor league contract and invited him to spring training.
December 8: Received Brandon Moss from the Oakland Athletics for Joe Wendle.
December 12-December 15: Signed 5 players to a minor league contract and invited 3 of them to spring training.
December 16: Signed Gavin Floyd and sent Nick Maronde to the minors.
December 18-December 20: Signed 3 players to a minor league contract and invited 2 of them to spring training.
January 6-January 26: Released Tyler Cloyd and signed 5 players to a minor league contract, inviting 3 to spring training.
January 27: Invited 7 non-roster players to spring training.

Regular season

Season summary

Opening Day starting lineup 
 CF Michael Bourn
 2B Jason Kipnis
 LF Michael Brantley
 1B Carlos Santana
 C Yan Gomes
 RF Brandon Moss
 DH Ryan Raburn
 3B Lonnie Chisenhall
 SS José Ramírez
SP Corey Kluber

April 
The Indians opened the season on April 6 against the Houston Astros at Minute Maid Park.  Despite a strong pitching performance by reigning Cy Young Award winner Corey Kluber, the Indians failed to score against Dallas Keuchel and the Asros' pitching staff en route to a 2–0 loss.  The Indians would bounce back and win the next two games over the Astros as Carlos Carrasco and Trevor Bauer would combine to pitch  shutout innings.  Indians pitchers recorded 36 strikeouts over the first three games.  On April 9, the Indians came within 2 outs of their first no-hitter since Len Barker's perfect game in 1981. Bauer and relievers, Kyle Crockett, Scott Atchison, and Nick Hagadone combined to hold the Houston Astros hitless through the first  innings. Jed Lowrie broke up the no-hit bid with a home run. Bauer is the first pitcher since 1914 to have at least 11 strikeouts and allow no hits in 6 innings or less.

The Indians' first game at the newly renovated Progressive Field was on April 10, an 8–4 loss to the rival Detroit Tigers.  The Indians would struggle to a 7–14 record in April putting them at the bottom of the AL Central. The vast majority of their games were played against division rivals.  Reigning Cy Young Award winner Corey Kluber failed to record a win in five starts in April, posting a record of 0–3.

May 
The Indians' early struggles continued into the first two weeks of May.  On May 14, the team was 12–21, which was the worst record in the American League.  The Indians had gone over a month without winning consecutive games, the last time they had done so was the second and third games of the season.  The Indians broke that streak by winning two games over the Texas Rangers on May 15 and 16, before winning six straight games from May 19–24.  This streak included a sweep over their interleague rivals, the Cincinnati Reds.  The Indians won 12 of their last 17 games in May, to climb to within two games of .500.

On May 13, Corey Kluber struck out 18 St. Louis Cardinals batters in 8 innings pitched. He became the first pitcher since Randy Johnson in 2004 to strike out that many in one game, the first American League pitcher with at least 18 strikeouts in a game since Roger Clemens did in 1998, and also tied the franchise record for strikeouts in a game set by Bob Feller in 1938.

Offensively, the Indians were led by second baseman Jason Kipnis, who was named the American League Player of the Month.  During May, Kipnis hit .429 with 51 hits and 15 doubles, both of which are the most by any MLB player in a month since 2009.  He also had an on-base percentage of .511.

June 

The Indians struggled to an 11–15 record during the month of June.  The team won 3 of its first 5 games of the month to climb to within a game of .500, but would then lose 13 of its next 19 games to fall to 33–41 and last place in the AL Central.  Kluber failed to record a win for the second month this season, and his record fell to 3–9 by month's end.  The Indians' struggles were shown most clearly during a double header in Baltimore on June 28.  The Tribe lost both games, 4–0 and 8–0, marking the first time since 1975 that the Indians were shut out in both games of a doubleheader.

June also saw the Indians send opening day infielders Lonnie Chisenhall and José Ramírez to AAA Columbus and brought up infielders Giovanny Urshela and former first round pick Francisco Lindor.

One bright spot for the Indians was the emergence of SP Cody Anderson.  In two starts in June, Anderson went  innings, giving up only one earned run.  Anderson's second start on June 29 was the first of three consecutive starts in which an Indians' pitcher took a perfect game into at least the 6th inning.

July 

The Indians began July right where they ended June, with a dominant pitching performance.  On July 1,  SP Carlos Carrasco would come within one out of a no-hitter in an 8–1 win over the Tampa Bay Rays, marking the third consecutive start in which an Indians' pitcher took a perfect game into at least the 6th inning.

On July 5, 2B Jason Kipnis was named as the Indians' lone representative in the All-Star Game as a reserve.  He had one at-bat, in which he struck out.

The Indians' inconsistent play continued throughout July, as they would have several winning and losing streaks of at least three games.  Shortly after the All-Star Break, the Indians had a major set-back as they would get swept in four games by the Chicago White Sox at home, part of a 1–6 home stand.  This moved the Indians back into last place in the division, and seemingly out of the playoff race.

The Indians would make several trades before the July 31 non-waiver trade deadline.  They sent OF David Murphy to the Los Angeles Angels of Anaheim for AA infielder Eric Stamets.  They traded 1B/OF Brandon Moss to the St. Louis Cardinals for pitching prospect and 2013 first round draft pick Rob Kaminsky.  Lastly, they traded RP Marc Rzepczynski to the San Diego Padres for AAA OF Abraham Almonte.

Despite these struggles, the Indians would go on to win the final three games of the month to finish July at 13–13.

August 
The Indians struggles continued, as they would lose five of their first six games of the month, falling ten games below .500 on August 7.  On that day, they traded CF Michael Bourn and 1B/OF Nick Swisher and $10 million in cash considerations to the Atlanta Braves for 1B Chris Johnson.  The team would bring up OF Abraham Almonte from AAA Columbus after the trade.

The Tribe began a turnaround on August 8, as they would win their next four games, and close out the month winning 15 of 23, including 9 of 10 home games.  During this stretch, the Indians recorded 10 base hits in 10 consecutive games, something the Indians had not accomplished since 1936.  At the end of the month, the Indians had climbed to within two games of .500 at 64–66, and four games behind the Texas Rangers for the second wild card spot.

September–October 
The Indians played the majority of the season's final month against their Central Division rivals.  The Indians lost 3 of their first 4 games of the month while Kluber suffered a hamstring injury, causing him to miss 12 days.  The Indians then won five of their next six games between September 6 and 13, improving their record to 70–70 and marking the first time the Indians were .500 since they were 2–2.  The Indians would also be 71–71, 72–72, 73–73, and 74–74, but lost the following game each time.  They briefly made it over the .500 mark at 77–76 on September 26, but went on to lose three in a row.

The Indians spent much of September 3–5 games behind the Texas Rangers or Houston Astros for the second wild card spot in the American League.  They remained mathematically in the playoff race until the final week of the season, when they lost three out of four to the Minnesota Twins, another one of the teams in the hunt for the last playoff spot. The Indians were officially eliminated from the wild card race during this series on September 30. The Tribe however went on to sweep the Boston Red Sox in their final series of the season, to finish the season at 81–80. This marked the third straight season that the Indians finished above .500, which had not happened since 1999 through 2001.

Season standings

American League Central

American League Wild Card

Record against opponents

Detailed records
(End of regular season)

Game log

|- bgcolor="#ffbbbb"
| 1 || April 6 || @ Astros || 2–0 || Keuchel (1–0) || Kluber (0–1) || Gregerson (1) || 43,573 || 0–1
|- bgcolor="#bbffbb"
| 2 || April 8 || @ Astros || 2–0 || Carrasco (1–0) || Feldman (0–1) || Allen (1) || 23,078 || 1–1
|- bgcolor="#bbffbb"
| 3 || April 9 || @ Astros || 5–1 || Bauer (1–0)  || Wojciechowski (0–1) ||  || 22,593 || 2–1
|- bgcolor="#ffbbbb"
| 4 || April 10 || Tigers || 8–4 || Simón (1–0) || McAllister (0–1) || Soria (1) || 35,789 || 2–2
|- bgcolor="#ffbbbb"
| 5 || April 11 || Tigers || 9–6 || Krol (1–0) || Allen (0–1) ||  || 23,161 || 2–3
|- bgcolor="#ffbbbb"
| 6 || April 12 || Tigers || 8–5 || Lobstein (1–0) || House (0–1) || Soria (2) || 19,555 || 2–4
|- bgcolor="#ffbbbb"
| 7 || April 14 || White Sox || 4–1 || Quintana (1–0) || Carrasco (1–1) || Robertson (2) || 10,642 || 2–5
|- bgcolor="#bbffbb"
| 8 || April 15 || White Sox || 4–2 || Bauer (2–0) || Danks (0–2) || Allen (2) || 11,042 || 3–5
|- bgcolor="#ffbbbb"
| 9 || April 17 || @ Twins || 3–2 (11) || Boyer (1–1) || Shaw (0–1) ||  || 21,307 || 3–6
|- bgcolor="#bbffbb"
| 10 || April 18 || @ Twins || 4–2 || Salazar (1–0) || Hughes (0–3) || Allen (3) || 23,949 || 4–6
|- bgcolor="#ffbbbb"
| 11 || April 19 || @ Twins || 7–2 || May (1–1) || House (0–2) ||  || 17,923 || 4–7
|- bgcolor="#ffbbbb"
| 12 || April 20 || @ White Sox || 4–3 || Robertson (1–0) || Allen (0–2) ||  || 13,055 || 4–8
|- bgcolor="#bbffbb"
| 13 || April 21 || @ White Sox || 6–2 || Carrasco (2–1) || Noesí (0–2) ||  || 14,032 || 5–8
|- bgcolor="#ffbbbb"
| 14 || April 22 || @ White Sox || 6–0 || Samardzija (1–1) || Kluber (0–2) ||  || 14,429 || 5–9
|- bgcolor="#bbffbb"
| 15 || April 24 || @ Tigers || 13–1 || Salazar (2–0) || Greene (3–1) ||  || 28,192 || 6–9
|- bgcolor="#ffbbbb"
| 16 || April 25 || @ Tigers || 4–1 || Simón (4–0) || House (0–3) || Soria (6) || 35,473 || 6–10
|- bgcolor="#ffbbbb"
| 17 || April 26 || @ Tigers || 8–6 || Lobstein (2–1) || Carrasco (2–2) || Soria (7) || 30,698 || 6–11
|- bgcolor="#ffbbbb"
| 18 || April 27 || Royals || 6–2 || Vargas (2–1) || Kluber (0–3) ||  || 9,668 || 6–12
|- bgcolor="#ffbbbb"
| 19 || April 28 || Royals || 11–5 || Finnegan (1–0) || Atchison (0–1) ||  || 10,698 || 6–13
|- bgcolor="#bbffbb"
| 20 || April 29 || Royals || 7–5 || Salazar (3–0) || Ventura (2–2) || Allen (4) || 10,284 || 7–13
|- bgcolor="#ffbbbb"
| 21 || April 30 || Blue Jays || 5–1 || Francis (1–0) || House (0–4) ||  || 9,798 || 7–14
|-

|- bgcolor="#bbffbb"
| 22 || May 1 || Blue Jays || 9–4 || Carrasco (3–2) || Buehrle (3–2) ||  || 15,088 || 8–14
|- bgcolor="#ffbbbb"
| 23 || May 2 || Blue Jays || 11–4 || Sanchez (2–2) || Kluber (0–4) || || 18,008 || 8–15
|- bgcolor="#bbffbb"
| 24 || May 3 || Blue Jays || 10–7 || Rzepczynski (1–0) || Francis (1–1) || || 16,128 || 9–15
|- bgcolor="#ffbbbb"
| 25 || May 5 || @ Royals || 5–3 || Vargas (3–1) || Salazar (3–1) || Davis (6) || 29,099 || 9–16
|- bgcolor="#bbffbb"
| 26 || May 6 || @ Royals || 10–3 || Carrasco (4–2) || Duffy (2–1) || || 23,316 || 10–16
|- bgcolor="#ffbbbb"
| 27 || May 7 || @ Royals || 7–4 || Morales (3–0) || Kluber (0–5) || Holland (5) || 38,271 || 10–17
|- bgcolor="#ffbbbb"
| 28 || May 8 || Twins || 9–3 || Pelfrey (3–0) || Bauer (2–1) || || 19,102 || 10–18
|- bgcolor="#ffbbbb"
| 29 || May 9 || Twins || 7–4 || Hughes (2–4) || Chen (0–1) || Perkins (11) || 16,199 || 10–19
|- bgcolor="#bbffbb"
| 30 || May 10 || Twins || 8–3 || Salazar (4–1) || May (2–3) || || 13,769 || 11–19
|- bgcolor="#ffbbbb"
| 31 || May 12 || Cardinals || 8–3 || Lynn (2–3) || Carrasco (4–3) || || 12,615 || 11–20
|- bgcolor="#bbffbb"
| 32 || May 13 || Cardinals || 2–0 || Kluber (1–5) || Lackey (2–2) || Allen (5) || 12,313 || 12–20
|- bgcolor="#ffbbbb"
| 33 || May 14 || Cardinals || 2–1 || Siegrist (2–0) || Rzepczynski (1–1) || Rosenthal (12) || 15,865 || 12–21
|- bgcolor="#bbffbb"
| 34 || May 15 || @ Rangers || 8–3 || Webb (1–0) || Rodríguez (1–2) || || 29,524 || 13–21
|- bgcolor="#bbffbb"
| 35 || May 16 || @ Rangers || 10–8 || Atchison (1–1) || Feliz (1–2) || Allen (6) || 31,045 || 14–21
|- bgcolor="#ffbbbb"
| 36 || May 17 || @ Rangers || 5–1 || Martinez (3–0) || Carrasco (4–4) || || 32,189 || 14–22
|- bgcolor="#ffbbbb"
| 37 || May 18 || @ White Sox || 2–1 (10) || Duke (2–2) || McAllister (0–2) || || 17,712 || 14–23
|- bgcolor="#bbffbb"
| 38 || May 19 || @ White Sox || 3–1 || Bauer (3–1) || Quintana (2–4) || Allen (7) || 15,681 || 15–23
|- bgcolor="#bbffbb"
| 39 || May 20 || @ White Sox || 4–3 || Marcum (1–0) || Jennings (0–1) || Allen (8) || 15,146 || 16–23
|- bgcolor="#bbffbb"
| 40 || May 21 || @ White Sox || 5–2 || Salazar (5–1) || Danks (2–4) || || 18,321 || 17–23
|- bgcolor="#bbffbb"
| 41 || May 22 || Reds || 7–3 || Carrasco (5–4) || Leake (2–3) || || 23,617 || 18–23
|- bgcolor="#bbffbb"
| 42 || May 23 || Reds || 2–1 || Kluber (2–5) || Cingrani (0–1) || Allen (9) || 27,315 || 19–23
|- bgcolor="#bbffbb"
| 43 || May 24 || Reds || 5–2 || Bauer (4–1) || Iglesias (1–1) || || 23,882 || 20–23
|- bgcolor="#ffbbbb"
| 44 || May 25 || Rangers || 10–8 || Scheppers (1–0) || Rzepczynski (1–2) || Tolleson (4) || 13,614 || 20–24
|- bgcolor="#ffbbbb"
| 45 || May 26 || Rangers || 4–3 || Kela (4–1) || Hagadone (0–1) || Tolleson (5) || 11,352 || 20–25
|- bgcolor="#bbffbb"
| 46 || May 27 || Rangers || 12–3 || Carrasco (6–4) || Lewis (4–3) || || 15,956 || 21–25
|- bgcolor="#bbffbb"
| 47 || May 28 || @ Mariners || 5–3 || Kluber (3–5) || Paxton (3–3) || Allen (10) || 19,449 || 22–25
|- bgcolor="#ffbbbb"
| 48 || May 29 || @ Mariners || 2–1 || Walker (2–5) || Bauer (4–2) || Rodney (14) || 32,454 || 22–26
|- bgcolor="#bbffbb"
| 49 || May 30 || @ Mariners || 4–3 || Marcum (2–0) || Elias (2–2) || Allen (11) || 32,287 || 23–26
|- bgcolor="#bbffbb"
| 50 || May 31 || @ Mariners || 6–3 (12) || McAllister (1–2) || Leone (0–4) || Adams (1) || 32,112 || 24–26
|-

|- bgcolor="#bbffbb"
| 51 || June 2 || @ Royals || 2–1 || Carrasco (7–4) || Davis (2–1) || Allen (12) || 30,361 || 25–26
|- bgcolor="#ffbbbb"
| 52 || June 3 || @ Royals || 4–2 || Vargas (4–2) || Kluber (3–6) || Holland (8) || 29,899 || 25–27
|- bgcolor="#bbffbb"
| 53 || June 4 || @ Royals || 6–2 (8) || Bauer (5–2) || Young (4–2) || || 29,552 || 26–27
|- bgcolor="#ffbbbb"
| 54 || June 5 || Orioles || 5–2 || Tillman (3–7) || Marcum (2–1) || Britton (15) || 26,070 || 26–28
|- bgcolor="#bbffbb"
| 55 || June 6 || Orioles || 2–1 || Salazar (6–1) || Brach (3–2) || Allen (13) || 24,939 || 27–28
|- bgcolor="#ffbbbb"
| 56 || June 7 || Orioles || 7–3 || Norris (2–4) || Carrasco (7–5) || || 18,151 || 27–29
|- bgcolor="#ffbbbb"
| 57 || June 9 || Mariners || 3–2 || Elias (3–3) || Kluber (3–7) || Smith (2) || 11,425 || 27–30
|- bgcolor="#ffbbbb"
| 58 || June 10 || Mariners || 9–3 || Walker (3–6) || Bauer (5–3) ||  || 12,305 || 27–31
|- bgcolor="#bbffbb"
| 59 || June 11 || Mariners || 6–0 || Marcum (3–1) || Happ (3–2) || || 15,316 || 28–31
|- bgcolor="#ffbbbb"
| 60 || June 12 || @ Tigers || 4–0 || Price (6–2) || Salazar (6–2) || || 35,379 || 28–32
|- bgcolor="#bbffbb"
| 61 || June 13 || @ Tigers || 5–4 || Carrasco (8–5) || Hardy (2–1) || Allen (14) || 41,620 || 29–32
|- bgcolor="#ffbbbb"
| 62 || June 14 || @ Tigers || 8–1 || Simón (7–3) || Kluber (3–8) || || 36,994 || 29–33
|- bgcolor="#bbb"
|  || June 15 || @ Cubs || colspan=6| Postponed (rain). Makeup: August 24
|- bgcolor="#bbffbb"
| 63 || June 16 || @ Cubs || 6–0 || Bauer (6–3) || Arrieta (6–5) || || 35,914 || 30–33
|- bgcolor="#ffbbbb"
| 64 || June 17 || Cubs || 17–0 || Wada (1–1) || Marcum (3–2) || || 15,572 || 30–34
|- bgcolor="#bbffbb"
| 65 || June 18 || Cubs || 4–3 || McAllister (2–2) || Wood (3–3) || Shaw (1) || 15,891 || 31–34
|- bgcolor="#ffbbbb"
| 66 || June 19 || Rays || 4–1 || Karns (4–3) || Carrasco (8–6) || Boxberger (17) || 22,811 || 31–35
|- bgcolor="#ffbbbb"
| 67 || June 20 || Rays || 4–1 || Cedeno (1–0) || Kluber (3–9) || Boxberger (18) || 24,670 || 31–36
|- bgcolor="#bbffbb"
| 68 || June 21 || Rays || 1–0 || Allen (1–2) || Jepsen (1–5) || || 20,847 || 32–36
|- bgcolor="#ffbbbb"
| 69 || June 22 || Tigers || 8–5 || Hardy (3–1) || Bauer (6–4) || || 15,746 || 32–37
|- bgcolor="#ffbbbb"
| 70 || June 23 || Tigers || 7–3 || Price (7–2) || Salazar (6–3) || || 19,156 || 32–38
|- bgcolor="#bbffbb"
| 71 || June 24 || Tigers || 8–2 || Carrasco (9–6) || Farmer (0–2) || || 20,780 || 33–38
|- bgcolor="#ffbbbb"
| 72 || June 26 || @ Orioles || 4–3 || O'Day (5–0) || Rzepczynski (1–3) || Britton (22) || 31,112 || 33–39
|- bgcolor="#bbb"
| || June 27 || @ Orioles || colspan=6| Postponed (rain). Makeup: June 28 (Game 2)
|- bgcolor="#ffbbbb"
| 73 || June 28 || @ Orioles || 4–0 || Jiménez (7–3) || Bauer (6–5) || || 45,675 || 33–40
|- bgcolor="#ffbbbb"
| 74 || June 28 || @ Orioles || 8–0 || Tillman (6–7) || Murata (0–1) || || 40,006 || 33–41
|- bgcolor="#bbffbb"
| 75 || June 29 || @ Rays || 7–1 || Anderson (1–0) || Karns (4–4) || || 11,802 || 34–41
|- bgcolor="#bbffbb"
| 76 || June 30 || @ Rays || 6–2 || Salazar (7–3) || Ramírez (6–3) || || 10,437 || 35–41
|-

|- bgcolor="#bbffbb"
| 77 || July 1 || @ Rays || 8–1 || Carrasco (10–6) || Colomé (3–4) || || 11,394 || 36–41
|- bgcolor="#bbffbb"
| 78 || July 2 || @ Rays || 5–4 (10) || Shaw (1–1) || Cedeno (1–1) || Allen (15) || 16,353 || 37–41
|- bgcolor="#bbffbb"
| 79 || July 3 || @ Pirates || 5–2 || Bauer (7–5) || Morton (6–2) || Allen (16) || 38,840 || 38–41
|- bgcolor="#ffbbbb"
| 80 || July 4 || @ Pirates || 1–0 || Locke (5–4) || Anderson (1–1) || Melancon (26) || 37,928 || 38–42
|- bgcolor="#ffbbbb"
| 81 || July 5 || @ Pirates || 5–3 || Cole (12–3) || Salazar (7–4) || Melancon (27) || 36,812 || 38–43
|- bgcolor="#ffbbbb"
| 82 || July 6 || Astros || 9–4 || Keuchel (11–3) || Carrasco (10–7) ||  || 13,516 || 38–44
|- bgcolor="#bbffbb"
| 83 || July 7 || Astros || 2–0 || Kluber (4–9) || Velasquez (0–1) || Shaw (2) || 10,821 || 39–44
|- bgcolor="#bbffbb"
| 84 || July 8 || Astros || 4–2 || Bauer (8–5) || Thatcher (1–3) || Allen (17) || 15,255 || 40–44
|- bgcolor="#bbffbb"
| 85 || July 9 || Astros || 3–1 || Anderson (2–1) || Oberholtzer (2–2) || Allen (18) || 11,496 || 41–44
|- bgcolor="#bbffbb"
| 86 || July 10 || Athletics || 5–1 || Salazar (8–4) || Graveman (6–5) || Allen (19) || 28,539 || 42–44
|- bgcolor="#ffbbbb"
| 87 || July 11 || Athletics || 5–4 || O'Flaherty (1–2) || McAllister (2–3) || Clippard (17) || 28,733 || 42–45
|- bgcolor="#ffbbbb"
| 88 || July 12 || Athletics || 2–0 || Gray (10–3) || Kluber (4–10) || || 20,611 || 42–46
|- bgcolor=#bbb
| – || July 14 || 86th All-Star Game || colspan=6 | National League vs. American League (Great American Ball Park, Cincinnati, Ohio)
|- bgcolor="#ffbbbb"
| 89 || July 17 || @ Reds || 6–1 || Leake (7–5) || Bauer (8–6) || || 38,982 || 42–47
|- bgcolor="#bbffbb"
| 90 || July 18 || @ Reds || 9–4 || Kluber (5–10) || DeSclafani (5–7) || || 39,588 || 43–47
|- bgcolor="#bbffbb"
| 91 || July 19 || @ Reds || 5–3 (11) || Rzepczynski (2–3) || Villarreal (1–3) || McAllister (1) || 36,302 || 44–47
|- bgcolor="#ffbbbb"
| 92 || July 21 || @ Brewers || 8–1 || Garza (5–10) || Salazar (8–5) || || 34,379 || 44–48
|- bgcolor="#bbffbb"
| 93 || July 22 || @ Brewers || 7–5 || Adams (1–0) || Lohse (5–11) || Allen (20) || 32,588 || 45–48
|- bgcolor="#ffbbbb"
| 94 || July 23 || White Sox || 8–1 || Samardzija (7–5) || Bauer (8–7) || || 16,317 || 45–49
|- bgcolor="#ffbbbb"
| 95 || July 24 || White Sox || 6–0 || Quintana (5–9) || Kluber (5–11)  || — || 26,553 || 45–50
|- bgcolor="#ffbbbb"
| 96 || July 25 || White Sox || 10–3 || Sale (9–5) || Carrasco (10–8) || || 24,763 || 45–51
|- bgcolor="#ffbbbb"
| 97 || July 26 || White Sox || 2–1 || Rodon (4–3) || Salazar (8–6) || Robertson (21) || 17,751 || 45–52
|- bgcolor="#ffbbbb"
| 98 || July 27 || Royals || 9–4 || Vólquez (10–5) || Anderson (2–2) || Blanton (2) || 13,611 || 45–53
|- bgcolor="#ffbbbb"
| 99 || July 28 || Royals || 2–1 || Davis (7–1) || Bauer (8–8) || Holland (22) || 18,064 || 45–54
|- bgcolor="#bbffbb"
| 100 || July 29 || Royals || 12–1 || Kluber (6–11) || Guthrie (7–7) || || 19,767 || 46–54
|- bgcolor="#bbffbb"
| 101 || July 30 || @ Athletics || 3–1 || Carrasco (11–8) || Bassitt (0–4) || || 13,173 || 47–54
|- bgcolor="#bbffbb"
| 102 || July 31 || @ Athletics || 2–1 || Salazar (9–6) || Mujica (2–3) || Allen (21) || 28,152 || 48–54
|-

|- bgcolor="#ffbbbb"
| 103 || August 1 || @ Athletics || 5–1 || Brooks (1–0) || Anderson (2–3) || || 19,046 || 48–55
|- bgcolor="#ffbbbb"
| 104 || August 2 || @ Athletics || 2–1 (10) || Rodriguez (2–1) || Allen (1–3) || || 21,498 || 48–56
|- bgcolor="#ffbbbb"
| 105 || August 3 || @ Angels || 5–4 || Richards (11–8) || Kluber (6–12) || Street (26) || 37,030 || 48–57
|- bgcolor="#bbffbb"
| 106 || August 4 || @ Angels || 2–0 (12) || McAllister (3–3) || Alvarez (2–3) || Allen (22) || 38,159 || 49–57
|- bgcolor="#ffbbbb"
| 107 || August 5 || @ Angels || 4–3 || Bedrosian (1–0) || Allen (1–4) || || 33,099 || 49–58
|- bgcolor="#ffbbbb"
| 108 || August 7 || Twins || 10–9 || May (8–7) || Shaw (1–2) || Perkins (30) || 30,365 || 49–59
|- bgcolor="#bbffbb"
| 109 || August 8 || Twins || 17–4 || Bauer (9–8) || Santana (2–3) || || 31,666 || 50–59
|- bgcolor="#bbffbb"
| 110 || August 9 || Twins || 8–1 || Kluber (7–12) || Hughes (10–8) || || 21.305 || 51–59
|- bgcolor="#bbffbb"
| 111 || August 11 || Yankees || 5–4 (16) || Adams (2–0) || Pinder (0–2) || || 23,618 || 52–59
|- bgcolor="#bbffbb"
| 112 || August 12 || Yankees || 2–1 || Salazar (10–6) || Sabathia (4–9) || Allen (23) || 18,844 || 53–59
|- bgcolor="#ffbbbb"
| 113 || August 13 || Yankees || 8–6 || Eovaldi (12–2) || Bauer (9–9) || Miller (25) || 23,076 || 53–60
|- bgcolor="#bbffbb"
| 114 || August 14 || @ Twins || 6–1 || Kluber (8–12) || May (8–8) || || 26,910 || 54–60
|- bgcolor="#ffbbbb"
| 115 || August 15 || @ Twins || 4–1 || Duffey (1–1) || Tomlin (0–1) || || 30,601 || 54–61
|- bgcolor="#ffbbbb"
| 116 || August 16 || @ Twins || 4–1 || Milone (6–3) || Carrasco (11–9) || Perkins (31) || 27,244 || 54–62
|- bgcolor="#bbffbb"
| 117 || August 17 || @ Red Sox || 8–2 || Salazar (11–6) || Barnes (3–3) || || 32,701 || 55–62
|- bgcolor="#ffbbbb"
| 118 || August 18 || @ Red Sox || 9–1 || Rodríguez (7–5) || Bauer (9–10) || || 31,907 || 55–63
|- bgcolor="#ffbbbb"
| 119 || August 19 || @ Red Sox || 6–4 || Kelly (6–6) || Kluber (8–13) || Tazawa (1) || 32,465 || 55–64
|- bgcolor="#bbffbb"
| 120 || August 20 || @ Yankees || 3–2 || Tomlin (1–1) || Nova (5–5) || Allen (24) || 36,129 || 56–64
|- bgcolor="#bbffbb"
| 121 || August 21 || @ Yankees || 7–3 || Carrasco (12–9) || Tanaka (9–6) || Allen (25) || 35,940 || 57–64
|- bgcolor="#ffbbbb"
| 122 || August 22 || @ Yankees || 6–2 || Severino (1–2) || Salazar (11–7) || || 47,031 || 57–65
|- bgcolor="#bbffbb"
| 123 || August 23 || @ Yankees || 4–3 || Shaw (2–2) || Betances (6–3) || Allen (26) ||  46,945 || 58–65
|- bgcolor="#ffbbbb"
| 124 || August 24 || @ Cubs || 2–1 || Rondon (5–2) || McAllister (3–4) || || 36,283 || 58–66
|- bgcolor="#bbffbb"
| 125 || August 25 || Brewers || 11–6 || Tomlin (2–1) || Peralta (4–8) || || 11,687 || 59–66
|- bgcolor="#bbffbb"
| 126 || August 26 || Brewers || 6–2 || Manship (1–0) || Nelson (10–10) || || 13,052 || 60–66
|- bgcolor="#bbffbb"
| 127 || August 28 || Angels || 3–1 || Bauer (10–10) || Gott (2–2) || Allen (27) || 22.273 || 61–66
|- bgcolor="#bbffbb"
| 128 || August 29 || Angels || 8–3 || Shaw (3–2) || Smith (4–4) || || 22,843 || 62–66
|- bgcolor="#bbffbb"
| 129 || August 30 || Angels || 9–2 || Tomlin (3–1) || Weaver (6–10) || || 22,328 || 63–66
|- bgcolor="#bbffbb"
| 130 || August 31 || @ Blue Jays || 4–2 || Salazar (12–7) || Price (13–5) || Allen (28) || 46,643 || 64–66
|-

|- bgcolor="#ffbbbb"
| 131 || September 1 || @ Blue Jays || 5–3 (10) || Lowe (1–2) || Shaw (3–3) || || 41,356 || 64–67
|- bgcolor="#ffbbbb"
| 132 || September 2 || @ Blue Jays || 5–1 || Dickey (10–10) || Bauer (10–11) || || 46,538 || 64–68
|- bgcolor="#bbffbb"
| 133 || September 4 || @ Tigers || 8–1 || Tomlin (4–1) || Lobstein (3–6) || || 26,378 || 65–68
|- bgcolor="#ffbbbb"
| 134 || September 5 || @ Tigers || 6–0 || Simón (12–9) || Salazar (12–8) || || 28,949 || 65–69
|- bgcolor="#bbffbb"
| 135 || September 6 || @ Tigers || 4–0 || Anderson (3–3) || Verlander (3–7) || || 28,964 || 66–69
|- bgcolor="#bbffbb"
| 136 || September 7 || @ White Sox || 3–2 || Bauer (11–11) || Sale (12–8) || Allen (29) || 14,757 || 67–69
|- bgcolor="#ffbbbb"
| 137 || September 8 || @ White Sox || 7–4 || Rodon (7–6) || Carrasco (12–10) || || 11,990 || 67–70
|- bgcolor="#bbffbb"
| 138 || September 9 || @ White Sox || 6–4 || Tomlin (5–1) || Samardzija (9–12) || Allen (30) || 11,667 || 68–70
|- bgcolor="#bbffbb"
| 139 || September 10 || Tigers || 7–5 || Allen (2–4)  || Hardy (4–3) ||  || 11,166 || 69–70
|- bgcolor="#bbb"
| — || September 11 || Tigers || colspan=6| Postponed (rain). Makeup: September 13 (Game 2)
|- bgcolor="#bbb"
| — || September 12 || Tigers || colspan=6| Cancelled (rain)
|- bgcolor="#bbffbb"
| 140 || September 13 || Tigers || 7–2 || Anderson (4–3) || Verlander (3–8) || || — || 70–70
|- bgcolor="#ffbbbb"
| 141 || September 13 || Tigers || 9–2 || VerHagen (1–0) || Bauer (11–12) || || 14,487 || 70–71
|- bgcolor="#bbffbb"
| 142 || September 14 || Royals || 8–3 || Carrasco (13–10) || Vólquez (13–8) || || 10,356 || 71–71
|- bgcolor="#ffbbbb"
| 143 || September 15 || Royals || 2–0 || Medlen (4–1) || Tomlin (5–2) || Holland (31) || 10,516 || 71–72
|- bgcolor="#bbffbb"
| 144 || September 16 || Royals || 5–1 || Salazar (13–8) || Duffy (7–8) || || 11,103 || 72–72
|- bgcolor="#ffbbbb"
| 145 || September 17 || Royals || 8–4 || Ventura (12–8) || Kluber (8–14) || Holland (32) || 13,125 || 72–73
|- bgcolor="#bbffbb"
| 146 || September 18 || White Sox || 12–1 || Anderson (5–3) || Sale (12–10) || || 16,149 || 73–73
|- bgcolor="#ffbbbb"
| 147 || September 19 || White Sox || 4–3 || Rodon (8–6) || Carrasco (13–11) || Robertson (30) || 16,390 || 73–74
|- bgcolor="#bbffbb"
| 148 || September 20 || White Sox || 6–3 || Tomlin (6–2) || Danks (7–13) || Allen (31) || 13,282 || 74–74
|- bgcolor="#ffbbbb"
| 149 || September 22 || @ Twins || 3–1 || Santana (6–4) || Salazar (13–9) || Jepsen (13) || 21,850 || 74–75
|- bgcolor="#ffbbbb"
| 150 || September 23 || @ Twins || 4–2 || Hughes (11–9) || Kluber (8–15) || || 17,831 || 74–76
|- bgcolor="#bbffbb"
| 151 || September 24 || @ Twins || 6–3 || Anderson (6–3) || Gibson (10–11) || Allen (32) || 21,366 || 75–76
|- bgcolor="#bbffbb"
| 152 || September 25 || @ Royals || 6–0 || Carrasco (14–11) || Vólquez (13–9) || || 37,049 || 76–76
|- bgcolor="#bbffbb"
| 153 || September 26 || @ Royals || 9–5 || McAllister (4–4) || Medlen (5–2) || || 38,167 || 77–76
|- bgcolor="#ffbbbb"
| 154 || September 27 || @ Royals || 3–0 || Young (11–6) || Salazar (13–10) || Davis (14) || 36,339 || 77–77
|- bgcolor="#ffbbbb"
| 155 || September 28 || Twins || 4–2 || Milone (9–5) || Kluber (8–16) || Jepsen (14) || 10,007 || 77–78
|- bgcolor="#bbb"
| — || September 29 || Twins || colspan=6| Postponed (rain). Makeup: September 30 (Game 1)|- bgcolor="#ffbbbb"
| 156 || September 30 || Twins || 7–1 || Gibson (11–11) || Carrasco (14–12) || || — || 77–79
|- bgcolor="#bbffbb"
| 157 || September 30 || Twins || 10–2 || Anderson (7–3) || Pelfrey (6–11) || || 10,228 || 78–79
|- bgcolor="#ffbbbb"
| 158 || October 1 || Twins || 4–2 || Perkins (3–5) || Allen (2–5) || Jepsen (15) || 22,644 || 78–80
|- bgcolor="#bbffbb"
| 159 || October 2 || Red Sox || 8–2 || Tomlin (7–2) || Owens (4–4) || || 28,273 || 79–80
|- bgcolor="#bbffbb"
| 160 || October 3 || Red Sox || 2–0 || Kluber (9–16) || Breslow (0–4) || Allen (33) || 17,342 || 80–80
|- bgcolor="#bbffbb"
| 161 || October 4 || Red Sox || 3–1 || Salazar (14–10) || Porcello (9–15) || Allen (34) || 17,844 || 81–80
|-

|- style="text-align:center;"
| Legend:       = Win       = Loss       = PostponementBold = Indians team memberPlayer stats

BattingNote: G = Games played; AB = At bats; R = Runs scored; H = Hits; 2B = Doubles; 3B = Triples; HR = Home runs; RBI = Runs batted in; AVG = Batting average; SB = Stolen basesPitchingNote: W = Wins; L = Losses; ERA = Earned run average; G = Games pitched; GS = Games started; SV = Saves; IP = Innings pitched; H = Hits allowed; R = Runs allowed; ER = Earned runs allowed; BB = Walks allowed; K = Strikeouts''

Roster

Farm system

LEAGUE CHAMPIONS: Columbus

References

External links

2015 Cleveland Indians Season Official Site 
2015 Cleveland Indians season at Baseball Reference

Cleveland Guardians seasons
Cleveland
2015 in sports in Ohio